Sedilo is a comune (municipality) in the Province of Oristano in the Italian region of Sardinia, about  north of Cagliari and about  northeast of Oristano. It borders the municipalities of Aidomaggiore, Bidonì, Dualchi, Ghilarza, Noragugume, Olzai, Ottana and Sorradile.

The Sanctuary of San Costantino Imperatore in Sedilo, whose main church was built in the 16th century around a 6th-century one. It is in Gothic-Catalan style.

References

Cities and towns in Sardinia